Steve Gibson is a Republican member of the Montana Legislature.  He was elected to House District 78 which represents the East Helena area.

References

Living people
Year of birth missing (living people)
Republican Party members of the Montana House of Representatives